Mi-kyung or Mi-kyoung, also spelled Mi-gyeong or Mi-gyong is a Korean feminine given name. It was South Korea's most popular name for baby girls in 1968. Its meaning differs based on the hanja used to write each syllable of the name.

Hanja
There are 33 hanja with the reading "mi" and 54 hanja with the reading "kyung" on the South Korean government's official list of hanja which may be used in given names. Some ways of writing this name in hanja include:

 (아름다울 미 areumdaul mi, 서울 경 seoul gyeong): "beautiful capital city". These characters are also used to write the Japanese given name Miyako.
 (아름다울 미 areumdaul mi, 볕 경 byeot gyeong): "beautiful sunshine"
 (아름다울 미 areumdaul mi, 공경할 경 gonggyeonghal gyeong): "beautifully respect"

People
People with this name include:

Artists and writers
Jung Mikyung (born 1960), South Korean novelist
Yun Mi-kyung (born 1980), South Korean manhwa artist
Mikyoung Kim, American landscape architect of Korean descent

Entertainers
Won Mi-kyung (born 1960), South Korean actress
Yang Mi-kyung (born 1961), South Korean actress
Kim Mi-kyung (born 1963), South Korean actress

Sportspeople
Kim Mi-gyeong (athlete) (born 1967), South Korean long-distance runner
Lim Mi-kyung (born 1967), South Korean team handball player
Yun Mi-gyeong (born 1968), South Korean sprinter
Lee Mi-kyung (sport shooter) (born 1969), South Korean sport shooter
Chang Mi-kyung (born 1973), South Korean fencer
Chun Mi-kyung (born 1973), South Korean fencer
Park Mee-kyung (born 1975), South Korean volleyball player
Ri Mi-gyong (born 1990), North Korean table tennis player
Kim Mi-gyong (born 1991), North Korean long-distance runner
Choe Mi-gyong (born 1991), North Korean football player
Lee Mi-gyeong (handballer) (born 1991), South Korean handball player

See also
List of Korean given names

References

Korean feminine given names